Luke George Girgis (born 20 August 1987), better known by his stage name, Coptic Soldier, is an Australian hip-hop artist, music manager and record label executive. He often performed with stage partner, Phatchance (aka Chance Waters) and later became his manager. Girgis co-founded a record label, I Forgot Sorry! in 2010 and then a management company, Be Like Children, in 2013.

Early life and education 

Luke George Girgis was born on 20 August 1987 in Melbourne, his parents were second generation Egyptian migrants who raised him in Sydney's Sutherland Shire as a member of the Australian Coptic Orthodox church. As Coptic Soldier, he later recalled his first live band "A Year 12 rock band in the school hall when I was in Year 5. – Can’t remember their name...", from that performance he learnt "That no matter how bad your music is, you can always make a crowd laugh. Haha." He attended St Patrick's College; he obtained a degree in Rehabilitation Counselling at the University of Sydney before completing a degree in Theology at Charles Sturt University.

Hip hop artist 

Coptic Soldier was signed to Nurcha Records in 2005 before its closure in 2009. He remembered, in 2008, that he was "first introduced to hip hop by the likes of US bigwigs Eminem and Tupac, but has since drawn inspiration from artists closer to home." His performance name acknowledges his heritage in the Coptic Christian faith and his "fighting for what you believe in." He released his debut mix tape, False Start, on that label in 2006. InTheMix's Xpose described his work: "While this release isn't in the upper echelon of those currently coming out in this country, it definitely impressed me. Potential wise Coptic Soldier has a lot to offer, he is an emcee you want to hear more from as he speaks what is on many of our minds." As from 2007 he ran an artist management company, The Girgis Circus, which catered for his fellow artists, including Phatchance aka Chance Waters.

In 2010 Coptic Soldier teamed up with Sydney soul vocalist Miriam Waks and independently released an extended play, The Sound of Wings, which was produced by K21, an Adelaide-based hip hop artist. As a solo artist he independently distributed a release, The Past Three Years. He described it as "a street release that really reflects my life in the last three years... I write basically whatever is on my mind. Most recently I have been in huge reflection about my growth and fortune, so all the music I seem to be writing at the moment shows just that."

In March 2010 he joined Phatchance for a national tour, Inkstains, which saw the pair co-headline nine dates across Australia. He also provided management for other hip hop artists Mind over Matter and Elgen & Johnny Utah; and for a pop music artist, HR King. Also in that year he co-founded an independent record label, I Forget, Sorry!, together with Phatchance and Mind over Matter, to cater for the artists' releases. He explained his plans to Birdie of Beat magazine, "The biggest focus will be this acoustic tour for now but we do have a couple of other big things that we’ll work on after that. Chance is going to work on his album, which I’m excited about – that will hopefully be late this year or early next year. Then I'm going to be doing my album late next year too. For me the acoustic EP is a sequel to my debut EP [The Sound Of Wings] with Miriam Waks and a guy from Adelaide called K21 who won the Hilltop Hoods initiative."

During 2011 Coptic Soldier and Phatchance undertook a combined Hey Where's Your DJ tour, which Chris Singh of The AU Review caught, "When one thinks of live hip-hop, the usual picture in their head is that of at least one emcee rapping to the beats dropped by at least one DJ – a format often criticised by those outside of hip-hop. Every so often, a hip-hop act comes along and replaces the DJ with a backing band, not only giving their concert much more musical credibility, but allowing for more creative live interpretations of each of their songs... [the pair] decided to start experimenting with instrumental interpretations of their fine Aussie hip-hop tracks, national interest in these two emcees skyrocketed and their resulting acoustic EPs were met with more success than they hoped for."

In May of that year the pair appeared on Hip Hop Show on youth radio, Triple J; they were interviewed by the host, Hau Latukefu, who also played their tracks, "No More Waiting" (by Coptic Soldier featuring Phatchance) and "Liquid Company" (by Coptic Soldier, live in the studio). As Waters' manager, in 2012, he negotiated for that artist's album, Infinity, to appear on Shock Records. In May 2012 Coptic Soldier was performing solo shows through New South Wales to Coffs Harbour.

After Coptic Soldier 

In 2013 Coptic Soldier worked under his name, Luke Girgis, to negotiate a deal for Waters with Island Records Australia, a subsidiary of the Universal Music Group. Due to Waters' tracks being listed in the 2012 Triple J Hottest 100, that artist also signed a publishing contract with Universal Music Publishing. In that year Girgis established an independent management company, Be Like Children, with the mission statement to be "always artist first".

In 2014 Girgis was given funds from The Seed Arts Music Grant to attend a management workshop. He formed a performance duo, Run to Damascus, with Jon Reichardt to release a single, "Hide & Seek", via I Forget, Sorry! The track was mixed and executive produced by Waters. Also that year he and his business partner, Matt Cannings, became co-managers of Sydney-based pop rock act, Little Sea, and signed them to a deal with Sony Music Australia. They debuted at number 1 on the Australian iTunes music chart, before touring Australia as main support for international stars 5 Seconds of Summer. From 2014 to late 2016 he was the A&R and label director for Shock Records.

In 2015 Girgis oversaw the release of Little Sea's EP, With You Without You, featuring the single, "Change for Love", which peaked in the ARIA Singles Chart top 40. Early in 2017, after leaving Shock Records, he established Seventh Street Media with the acquisition of the privately owned music publications, Tone Deaf, The Brag and J Play.

Personal life 

Girgis lives in Sydney with his wife Christine and their child. He is an active Christian and provided his opinion on the Australian same-sex marriage postal survey conducted in 2017.

Discography

Albums
 Nobody Give Raph a Guest Spot with Phatchance (2008)
 The Past Three Years (2008)
 Coptic Soldier & Miriam Waks (2010) 
 The Sound of Wings 2 (with Miriam Waks) (2011)

Mixtapes
 False Start Mixtape (2006)
 Their Sound, Our Wings (18 December 2011)

Run to Damascus
 "Hide & Seek" (March 2014)

References

External links
 

1987 births
Australian male rappers
Australian people of Coptic descent
Australian people of Egyptian descent
Australian record producers
Coptic Christians
Australian Oriental Orthodox Christians
Coptic musicians
Living people
Musicians from Sydney